Manuel Rivera Garrido (born 16 March 1978 in Lima), known as Rivera, is a Peruvian football player. He currently plays for AC Bellinzona.

Club career
He is the team current captain and one of the longest current player for Bellinzona.

References

External links
Swiss Football League biography 
AC Bellinzona profile 

1978 births
Living people
Footballers from Lima
Association football midfielders
Peruvian footballers
AC Bellinzona players
SC Kriens players
FC Vaduz players
Peruvian expatriate footballers
Expatriate footballers in Switzerland
Expatriate footballers in Liechtenstein
Peruvian expatriate sportspeople in Switzerland
Peruvian expatriate sportspeople in Liechtenstein